Several species of plants are known by the common name umbrella grass or umbrella-grass, including:

Chloris truncata, a grass
Cyperus alternifolius, a sedge
Digitaria divaricatissima, a grass
Many species of the grass genus Enteropogon, such as Enteropogon acicularis
Several species of the sedge genus Fuirena

References